The seventeenth election to Glamorgan County Council, south Wales, took place in March 1946. It was preceded by the 1937 election and the 1940 and 1943 elections were postponed due to the Second World War. It was followed by the 1949 election.

Overview
Labour's comfortable majority on the council, including the aldermanic bench, remained unchanged.

Boundary changes
There were no boundary changes at this election.

Candidates
A significant number of Labour candidates were returned unopposed. A number of long-standing members stood down including the Reverend William Saunders, who was not selected as a Labour candidate and Gwilym Davies (Dulais Valley).

There was significant Communist opposition, particularly in the Rhondda where Labour had only narrowly retained the Rhondda West constituency at the previous year's General Election.

In Neath, it was originally reposed that long-serving councillor D.G. Davies, who had been a member of the county council with a few breaks foe twenty-five years, would stand again. However, he ultimately stood down.

Nine of the retiring aldermen sought re-election, the exceptions being the Rev William Saunders and Edgar Chappell.

Outcome
Labour retained their majority. In the Rhondda Valley, Labour withstood a Communist challenge This was the first county election for nine years as polling was reported as heavy in a number of wards, including the two contested wards at Pontypridd.

In the Neath area, Labour retained four seats but at Coedffranc the sitting member D.T. Jenkins was defeated by Communist Alun Thomas, a member of the Neath Rural council since 1937.

Results

Aberaman

Aberavon

Abercynon

Aberdare Town

Bargoed

Barry 
Dudley Howe had previously represented Cadoxton and gained the neighbouring Barry ward from Labour. However, Labour won Cadoxton for the first time against the new candidate.

Barry Dock

Blaengwawr

Bridgend

Briton Ferry

Cadoxton

Caerphilly

Cilfynydd

Coedffranc

Cowbridge

Cwm Aber

Cwmavon

Cymmer

Dinas Powys

Dulais Valley

Ferndale

Gadlys

Garw Valley

Glyncorrwg

Gower

Hengoed

Hopkinstown

Kibbor

Castell Coch

Llandeilo Talybont

Llanfabon

Llwydcoed

Llwynypia

Loughor

Maesteg, Caerau and Nantyffyllon

Maesteg, East and West

Mountain Ash
The sitting member, the Hon. John Bruce (Ind) stood down and Labour gained the seat without a contest.

Neath (North)

Neath (South)

Newcastle

Ogmore Valley

Penarth North

Penarth South

Pencoed

Penrhiwceiber

Pentre

Pontardawe

Pontyclun

Port Talbot East

Port Talbot West

Porthcawl

Pontlottyn

Pontypridd Town

Penygraig

Porth

Swansea Valley

Tonyrefail and Gilfach Goch

Trealaw

Treforest

Treherbert

Treorchy

Tylorstown

Vale of Neath

Ynyshir

Ystalyfera

Ystrad

Election of Aldermen
In addition to the 66 councillors the council consisted of 22 county aldermen. Aldermen were elected by the council, and served a six-year term. Following the 1946 election, there were eleven Aldermanic vacancies, all of which all of which were filled by Labour nominees despite the protestations of their opponents. Rhys Evans was the longest serving alderman, having first been elected in 1922.

The following retiring aldermen were re-elected:
Sidney Cadogan (Lab, Ystrad)
W.H. Davies (Lab, Gower)
Alfred Evans (Lab, Ferndale)
Rhys Evans (Lab, Treorchy)
Tom Evans (Lab, Pengam)
Daniel T. Jones (Lab, Ystalyfera)
W. Arthur Jones (Lab, Tonyrefail)
Evan Phillips (Lab, Caerphilly)
Rev W. Degwel Thomas (Lab, Neath)

The following new aldermen were elected:
H.J. Cook (Lab, Penarth)
Mervyn Payne (Lab, Pencoed)

By-elections
Eleven vacancies were caused by the election of aldermen. At Neath, Charles P. Huins held his seat with a majority whip exceeded that gained by Alderman Degwel Thomas at the triennial election.

Aberaman by-election

Neath South by-election

Llanfabon by-election

Tylorstown by-election

References

Bibliography

1946
1946 Welsh local elections
1940s in Glamorgan